Nesibe Aydın Gençlik ve Spor Kulübü  is a Turkish women's basketball club based in Ankara, Turkey. The club was founded in 2010 and currently competing in the Women's Basketball Super League.

Current roster

References

External links
 Official website 
 Turkish Basketball Federation 
 Eurobasket team page

Women's basketball teams in Turkey
Sports teams in Ankara
Basketball teams established in 2010
2010 establishments in Turkey